The Ukrainian Catholic Archiepiscopal Exarchate of Odesa – Crimea was established on 11 January 2002 from the Archiepiscopal Exarchate of Kyiv – Vyshhorod (which has now become the Ukrainian Catholic Major Archeparchy of Kyiv–Galicia). It has been divided on 13 February 2014, in Ukrainian Catholic Archiepiscopal Exarchate of Odesa and Ukrainian Catholic Archiepiscopal Exarchate of Crimea. The only archiepiscopal exarch was Archbishop Vasyl Ivasiuk, now transferred transfer to the see of the eparchy of Kolomyia-Chernivtsi of the Ukrainians.
 
They are two of the only five archiepiscopal exarchates which exist in the world, all part of the particular Ukrainian Greek Catholic Church and following the Byzantine Ukrainian Rite.

Status as Archiepiscopal Exarchate 

As Major Archbishops have similar authority to that of Patriarchs, Archiepiscopal Exarchates similarly have roughly the same status in canon law as Patriarchal Exarchates.

External links
 Catholic Hierarchy – Archiepiscopal Exarchate of Odesa (Ukrainian)
  GCatholic.org information page about the Archiepiscopal Exarchate
  Українська Греко-Католицька Церква: Синод єпископів УГКЦ розділив Одесько-Кримський екзархат
 Holy See Press Office: Other pontifical acts February 13, 2014

Ukrainian Greek Catholic Church
Odesa